Luo River, also known by its Chinese name as the  is a tributary of the Wei River.

History
The area between the Luo and the Yellow River was known in ancient China as Hexi ("[Lands] West of the River"). Its ownership was notably contested between Qin and Wei.

Rivers of Shaanxi